The 2017 Big Ten softball tournament was held at Wilpon Complex on the campus of University of Michigan in Ann Arbor, Michigan, from May 11 through May 13, 2017. As the tournament winner, Minnesota earned the Big Ten Conference's automatic bid to the 2017 NCAA Division I softball tournament. All games of the tournament aired on BTN.

Tournament

Only the top 12 participate in the tournament, therefore Rutgers and Maryland were not eligible to play.

References

 http://grfx.cstv.com/photos/schools/big10/sports/w-softbl/auto_pdf/2016-17/misc_non_event/17sballbracket.pdf
 http://www.mgoblue.com/sports/w-softbl/spec-rel/big-ten-2017.html 
 https://web.archive.org/web/20170511184758/http://www.bigten.org/sports/w-softbl/spec-rel/050817aab.html

Tournament
Big Ten softball tournament